The 1937 Hemel Hempstead by-election was held on 22 June 1937. The by-election was held due to the elevation to the peerage of the incumbent Conservative MP, J. C. C. Davidson. It was won by the Conservative candidate, his wife Frances Davidson, Viscountess Davidson.

Electoral history

Result

References

1937 elections in the United Kingdom
1937 in England
Hemel Hempstead
Politics of Dacorum
By-elections to the Parliament of the United Kingdom in Hertfordshire constituencies
20th century in Hertfordshire